Warmwell is a small village and civil parish in south west Dorset, England, situated on the B3390 road about  southeast of Dorchester. In 2013 the estimated population of the parish was 80.

Warmwell contains several historic buildings, including a Jacobean manor house, and from May 1937 was the home of RAF Station Woodsford airfield (later renamed RAF Warmwell), which is now a popular holiday site and contains a caravan park and several other small businesses.

References

External links

Villages in Dorset